Joel Potrykus is an American film director and screenwriter. His feature film debut Ape won the Best New Director prize at the 2012 Locarno Film Festival, while his follow-up feature Buzzard won the FIPRESCI Prize at the 2014 Ljubljana International Film Festival.

Early life
Potrykus was born and raised in Ossineke, Michigan, then moved to Grand Rapids, Michigan to study film at Grand Valley State University. Later, he earned his MFA in screenwriting from Emerson College.

Career
A stint as a stand-up comedian in New York City led to the inspiration for his first feature film, Ape. While spending a year as a temp at a Michigan mortgage company led to the inspiration of his second feature film, Buzzard. The book Walden by Henry David Thoreau was the influence for Potrykus' 2016 feature The Alchemist Cookbook, which builds on his themes of slackers and loneliness. His fourth feature film Relaxer, is a modern interpretation of Luis Buñuel's The Exterminating Angel. He's been the subject of retrospectives at the Brooklyn Academy of Music in 2015 and at the 2016 Valdivia Film Festival.

He currently teaches filmmaking at Grand Valley State University.

Style and influences
In 2016, Vimooz called Potrykus "The New King of Underground Cinema". Vague Visages credits him as the originator of the new genre, "metal slackerism".

Potrykus has cited the following directors and films as having an influence on his work; Alan Clarke's Made in Britain, Lindsay Anderson's O Lucky Man!, Martin Scorsese's Taxi Driver, Vincent Gallo's Buffalo ’66, Rick Alverson's The Comedy, Luis Buñuel's The Discreet Charm of the Bourgeoisie, Jim Jarmusch's Down by Law, Sam Raimi's Evil Dead, F. W. Murnau's Faust and James Nguyen's Birdemic; as well as the films of Michael Haneke, Kelly Reichardt, Jean-Luc Godard and Quentin Tarantino.

Filmography

Feature films
 Ape (2012)
 Buzzard (2014)
 The Alchemist Cookbook (2016)
 Relaxer (2018)

Short films
 Birthday Boy (1999) 
 Peter Knows Kelly's the Cool One (1999)
 The Ludovico Treatment (1999)
 Mice & Milk (2001)
 Gordon (2007)
 Coyote (2010)
 Thing from the Factory by the Field (2022)

References

External links

American male screenwriters
People from Alpena County, Michigan
Living people
Film directors from Michigan
Screenwriters from Michigan
Year of birth missing (living people)